Leonardo "Leo" Ferreira Gonçalves (born 11 October 2000), better known as Leonardo Muchacho, is a Brazilian professional footballer who plays as a forward for Desportivo Brasil.

Professional career
A youth product of Desportivo Brasil, Muchacho joined Internacional on loan in 2019. Muchacho made his professional debut with Internacional in a 1-0 Campeonato Brasileiro Série A loss to Fortaleza on 20 September 2020. He returned to Desportivo Brasil in January 2021 after his loan ended.

References

External links
 
 Desportivo Brasil Profile

2000 births
Living people
Sportspeople from Minas Gerais
Brazilian footballers
Association football forwards
Sport Club Internacional players
Campeonato Brasileiro Série A players